Alondra Boulevard is a west–east thoroughfare in the counties of Los Angeles and Orange.

Route description
Alondra Boulevard begins at Vermont Avenue in the city of Los Angeles. It passes major streets like Long Beach Boulevard, Avalon Boulevard, Alameda Street, Atlantic Boulevard, Lakewood Boulevard and Valley View Avenue. The thoroughfare terminates at La Mirada Boulevard (Los Angeles County Route N8) in Buena Park.

The street passes over Interstate 110 and Interstate 5 but does not have interchanges with them. Previously, Alondra Boulevard had an entrance at Interstate 5, but this was removed in 2014 with the widening of the freeway. Alondra Boulevard also had an interchange with the Harbor Freeway (formerly State Route 11, now Interstate 110), but this was replaced with the Redondo Beach Boulevard interchange in the 1980s.

Compton/Woodley Airport is situated along Alondra Boulevard.

History
The Alondra Avenue concrete T-beam bridge which crosses over the San Gabriel River in Bellflower was constructed in 1952 and was rehabilitated in 1972.

Incidents
In February 2020, an unnamed man was killed while another was wounded in a car-to-car shooting at the intersection of Alondra Boulevard and Poinsettia Avenue in Compton.

On November 16, 2020, a dead body was reported at the 12800 block of Alondra Boulevard in a landscaped median. The corpse was highly decomposed, suggesting that it had already been there for an extended period of time.

On November 17, 2020, 19-year-old Carl Lewis, a basketball player for the Sudbury Five, was shot and killed while sitting in his car parked on Alondra Boulevard in a reportedly gang related incident.

Transportation
Alondra Boulevard is serviced by Metro Local lines 128 and 460.

References

Streets in Los Angeles County, California
Streets in Orange County, California
Boulevards in the United States
Streets in Los Angeles
Bellflower, California
Buena Park, California
Carson, California
Cerritos, California
Compton, California
Gardena, California
La Mirada, California
Norwalk, California
Paramount, California
Santa Fe Springs, California